Munditia daedala is a species of small sea snail, a marine gastropod mollusk, in the family Liotiidae.

Distribution
This marine species occurs off Japan.

References

 Higo, S., Callomon, P. & Goto, Y. (1999). Catalogue and bibliography of the marine shell-bearing Mollusca of Japan. Osaka: Elle Scientific Publications. 749 pp.

External links
 To World Register of Marine Species

daedala
Gastropods described in 1863